Admilson Jorge Soares (born 22 January 2001), known as Soares, is a Bissau-Guinean professional footballer who plays as a centre-back.

Career 
Soares signed for French club Nancy on 6 August 2021. Eight days later, he made his debut for the club in a 1–0 Ligue 2 loss to Valenciennes.

References 

2000 births
Living people
Sportspeople from Bissau
Bissau-Guinean footballers
Association football central defenders
Batuque FC players
AS Nancy Lorraine players
Ligue 2 players
Championnat National 3 players
Bissau-Guinean expatriate footballers
Expatriate footballers in Cape Verde
Expatriate footballers in France
Bissau-Guinean expatriate sportspeople in Cape Verde
Bissau-Guinean expatriate sportspeople in France